Höfðingi (chieftain) is a type of Icelandic cheese, described as a "creamy-soft, almost runny cheese with a white rind/crust and a smooth, mild flavor." It has been described as similar to brie cheese.

References

 https://archive.today/20130201010454/http://www.randburg.com/is/ostabud/

External links 
 Icelandic Tourist Board information on cheeses

Icelandic cuisine
Cow's-milk cheeses